Juliano may refer to 

Juliano (given name)
Juliano (surname)

See also
Henrique & Juliano